Punthalathazham is a landlocked neighbourhood of the city of Kollam in the Indian state of Kerala. It is located around six kilometres east of the core Kollam (Quilon) city towards Kannanalloor (on Kollam-Kannanalloor-Ayoor road).
This place has a little geographical importance and serves as the tail boundary of Kollam Municipal Corporation.
Inhabitants belong to working and middle classes.

Etymology 
There is a story for giving this name to the place. In olden days when people travel from distant places this junction is used as a resting point at night, and they used to get their supper from a rich and aristocratic family called 'Punthala'. In Malayalam language  means "supper". Thus, the name  +  = Punthalathazham.

Topology 

Punthalathazham is in Kollam Taluk and comes under Vadakkevila  Village having population under 5000. One 50-feet height elevated concrete Water Tank is a major landmark in Punthalathazham Junction. One could stand on a higher spot and enjoy the sight of the whole village.

Punthalathazham is surrounded by several small satellite villages: Palathara in the south, No.2 Junction in the west, Peroor in the north and Decent Junction in the east.

The terrain is flat.

Climate
Punthalathazham has a moderate climate, with heavy rains during June–August due to the southwest monsoon. Winter starts from December and continues until February. In summer, the temperature rises to a maximum of 35 °C and 25 °C in the winters. Annual average rainfall is 310 cm.

Government Offices 
Veterinary Hospital
Vadakkevila KrishiBhavan (agricultural office)
Ayathil Electrical Section

Public Facilities 

The main centers of public activity in Punthalathazham consist of a library, a bus station and a market. The Y. M. V. A. Library was established in 1936. It is one of the oldest libraries in Kollam district registered under Thiruvithamkoor library council. The name of the bus stop itself is Punthalathazham Junction.

SNDP Branch
Milma Society- Estd in 1993

Recently, Kudumbasree units are added to the community.

Economy 
The people of Punthalathazham are generally employed in the service and private sectors. Others are daily earners. A large number of women work in cashew factories.

The primary crops are coconut and banana supports the economy.

Punthalathazham housed many small-scale producers like Agro Trade International (cashew nut trading), Amrutha Trading Company (supply pencil slats), Santha Cashew Factory, Image Office Automation (marketing Canon products), Saindhava books publishers etc.
Punthalathazham also has brick factories and sawmills.

Education 
Punthalathazham has an average literacy rate of 94.7%.
M.V.G.V.H.S.S is one of the oldest schools in Kollam district. Over thousand, students are studying in this school. Students gaining entry can complete their pre-university (plus-two) exams and attend the graduation courses of universities. School comes under Kundara educational sub-district. M.V.G.V.H.S.S was situated near Peroor Karunallur Bhagavathi Temple in the name Kalluvilla Pvt School. In 1944, it was under Y.M.V.A Library. Kunjan Pillai was the manager and H.M. Hereafter, school undertaken by Damodaran Pillai. His role was as an acting assistant. Narayana Pillai was willing to provide a place for the school near Peroor Meenakshi temple. Since then, it has been known as Meenakshi Vilasam school. In 1947, school comes under Kerala Government. After 19 years, it was raised to high school. In 1974 June, the school was divided into M.V.G.L.P.S and M.V.G.V.H.S. Now this school boasts vocational (since 1993) and non-vocational higher secondary (since 2000). S.M.D School (Sree Meenakshi Devasam)-Peroor, St Jude high School-Mukhathala, S.N public school-Vadakkevila and Navdeep Public School-Vettilathazham, are other well-known educational institutions with high-quality standards and more productivity. Main colleges around Punthalathazham are: T.K.M College of Engineering,T.K.M.College of Arts & Science, S.N College, Fathima Matha College, Younus College of Engineering, Perumon Engineering College, S.N Polytechnic-Kottiyam, N.S.S College-Kottiyam, N.S Memorial Nursing School-Palathara etc. Scores of parallel tutorials are also there.

Temples
Most of the inhabitants in Punthalathazham are Hindus. People are living in harmony, and any religious violence is unheard of.

Sree Meenakshi Temple (chettinada-പുത്തന്‍ നട) is a famous old temple situated near Punthalathazham at Peroor. Durga Devi is the main deity of this temple. However, Krishna has an equally important presence in the temple. Pooyam Maholsavam is the main festival in this temple. Temple-car procession on these days attracts tens of thousands of people.

Mangalathu temple (മംഗലത്ത് നട) Mangalathu temple is another old temple situated at Punthalathazham. The temple is famous for the Makayiram Maholsavam. Pooyam Maholsavam starts two days after the end of Makayiram Maholsavam. People belonging to all castes and communities participate in the festival.

Kattavila masjid (Kilikolloor palli) is a prominent mosque in the area. Kilikolloor palli and Meenakshi temple are situated close to each other. The mosque and temple are separated by Meenakshi Vilasam school. The co-existence of these two centers of worship of different religions is quite unique and is a standing example of the religious tolerance and harmony. The Friday prayers at the mosque are attended by a fairly high number of people.

Politics 

CPI(M) is the major political party here. Congress and BJP is used to create their marks often with the support of majority caste organizations. Punthalathazham is in Vadakkevila zone of Kollam corporation and is under Eravipuram constituency. Peoples been selected by them are,

Transport 
Trivandrum International airport is the nearest airport. The nearest railway stations are Kilikkollur Station (Kollam-Tenkasi route) and Kollam Junction (Trivandrum-Ernakulam route). Private and K.S.R.T.C bus services to nearby towns are available regularly.
Choorankal bridge, connecting Punthalathazham & Kollam bypass, is situated in between Palathara & Punthalathazham wards. Choorankal river carries water of Perumkulam, Peroor and Padanilam paddy fields.

Tourist attractions

Rookery Of Crows 
Crow Colony is the nickname of Punthalathazham. We can see a rookery of crows in this region.  It is best known as the site of crows. In between 6:00 p.m. and 6:00 a.m., you can see as many as one hundred times more crows than that of the entire human population here. Punthalathazham is an important hub for crows. Crows are the iconic symbol of Punthalathazham.

Pachakulam 
Pachakulam (green pond) is a pond in Punthalathazham, having beautiful light green color in all seasons. Technically, it is due to the presence of a rare African payal. It is being used as arattukulam (മംഗലത്ത് നട ആറാട്ട് കുളം) of Mangalathu Temple. Fishes like Varaal and Kaari are found in this pond.

Indilayappan Kavu  

Indilayappan Kavu (ഇണ്ടിളയപ്പന്‍ കാവ്‌) -also known as Vellayappan Kavu- is a part of  Indilayappan temple where the deity is Lord Sankara Narayanan, an incarnation of Lord Siva and Lord Vishnu. The Kavu is owned and protected by Pulinthanathu family. This sacred grove has a legacy of more than 400 years and is located about 100 meters from Ayathil junction on Kollam-Kannanalloor road. It is kept in its virgin style with hundreds of trees and herb species usually found in rain forests. Nature has blessed this grove with a natural stream on its north eastern side, keeping it evergreen and an abode of different snakes, birds and thousands of bats. All religious rites and rituals like Sarpa Bali, Noorum Palum and Kalamezhuthum Paattum are performed every year apart from conducting Aayilyam Pooja on all Aayilyam Nakshathram (star).
This sacred grove has a lot of botanical importance and protects the bio-diversity of the surrounding places.

Vadakkevila Temple
The Vadakkevila Koonambaikulam (വലിയകൂനംബായ്കുളം) temple is very near, a walkable distance. Deity there is a Goddess, named 'Koonambaikulathu Amma'.

Mukathala Murari (SreeKrishna) Temple 
Mukhathala Murari Temple (മുരാരി അമ്പലം-SreeKrishna Temple) is located about 1 km from Punthalathazham junction. Murari Temple (main deity is Lord Vishnu) is the very famous place of worship in Quilon. Vishnu is known as Murari as a daemon named Muran was killed by him. The last uthsavam (festival) of a Malayalam year in the entire Kerala takes place here. Mukhathala Murari temple is one of the single idols-worship temples in Kerala. Many foreigners are attracted by its architecture. Kalabham  (കളഭം) is the main ceremony conducted every year in this temple. Thiruvithamkoor devaswom board is the supervisor of this temple.

Offices of the Vadakkevila Village Office, Kilikolloor Post Office (Pin Code 691004) and Catholic Syrian Bank Ltd, are around Punthalathazham. Other offices include Kerala State Cashew Development Corporation Ltd (value addition unit), CPI(M) Kollam east area committee office, etc.

Major townships around Punthalathazham are Kottiyam, Chinnakada, Kannanalloor and Kundara. A proposed Kollam Technopark at Kundara has given a new glimpse of hope to the people.

Environmental issues

Perumkulam Ela is the main paddy field spread across (North-South) Punthalathazham. However, earth-filling (paddy field reclamation) is a major problem and no action have been taken to promote rice production in these fields. Lack of a good drainage system leads to  water logging in these fields. There are large areas of paddy cultivation rendered useless without activity. The people are on their way to victimization of consumerism. Pace of development of Punthalathazham is slow.

Gallery

Citations

References

1# Census India, Kerala (1971). Series9. Part 2

2#  Tourist Guide to Kerala, Motilal (UK) Books of India

Neighbourhoods in Kollam
Cities and towns in Kollam district